Jette railway station is a railway station in the municipality of Jette in Brussels, Belgium opened in 1892. The station is located south of the King Baudouin park on the Cardinal Mercier square, on the Belgian railway line 50 between the Bockstael and Berchem-Sainte-Agathe railway stations.

Nearby the railway station is the Jette station STIB/MIVB stop, which offers a connection with the Brussels tram route 19 as well as the bus routes 53 and 88.

History
The station opened on 17 September 1858.

Train services
The station is served by the following service(s):

Intercity services (IC-20) Lokeren - Dendermonde - Brussels - Aalst - Ghent (weekends)
Intercity services (IC-26) Sint-Niklaas - Lokeren - Dendermonde - Brussels - Halle - Tournai - Kortrijk (weekdays)
Brussels RER services (S3) Dendermonde - Brussels - Denderleeuw - Zottegem - Oudenaarde (weekdays)
Brussels RER services (S4) Aalst - Denderleeuw - Brussels-Luxembourg (- Etterbeek - Merode - Vilvoorde) (weekdays)
Brussels RER services (S10) Dendermonde - Brussels - Denderleeuw - Aalst

References

External links
 STIB/MIVB Website

Railway stations in Brussels
Jette
Railway stations opened in 1858